Gadani Fish Harbour is a fish harbour located in Gadani, the Hub District of Balochistan Province, southern Pakistan.

See also 
 List of fish harbours of Pakistan
 Karachi Fisheries Harbour Authority
 Fisheries Research and Training Institute, Lahore Pakistan

References

External links
 Four fish harbours planned - DAWN.com
 Sindh Coastal and Inland Community Development Project
 A brief on Fisheries in Pakistan

Fish harbours of Pakistan
Lasbela District
Economy of Balochistan, Pakistan